Cervo may refer to:

Places

Italy
 Cervo, Liguria, a comune in the province of Imperia in the region of Liguria 
 Cervo (river), a tributary of the River Sesia in the Piedmont region

Portugal
 Cervo (Ribeira de Pena), a civil parish in the municipality of Ribeira de Pena

Spain
Cervo, Lugo, a municipality of the Province of Lugo

Automobiles
 Suzuki Cervo, a small Kei car made by Japanese carmaker Suzuki.